Hannes is a masculine given name and a diminutive of Johannes or Hannibal.

Hannes may refer to:
Hannes Alfvén (1908–1995), Swedish chemist and Nobel-prize winner
Hannes Aigner (born 1989), German slalom canoeist and Olympic medalist
Hannes Androsch (born 1938), Austrian entrepreneur, consultant, politician and former Austrian Vice Chancellor
Hannes Anier (born 1993), Estonian footballer
Hannes Arch (born 1967), Austrian pilot
Hannes van Asseldonk (born 1992), Dutch racing driver
Hannes Astok (born 1964), Estonian journalist, radio presenter and politician
Hannes Bauer (born 1954), German trombonist and jazz musician
Hannes Baumann (born 1982), German sailor and Olympic competitor
Hannes de Boer (1899–1982), Dutch long jumper and Olympic competitor
Hannes Bok (1914–1964), American artist and writer
Hannes Brewis (1930–2007), South African rugby player
Hannes van der Bruggen (born 1993), Belgian footballer
Hannes Coetzee (born 1944), South African guitarist
Hannes Van Dahl (born 1990), Swedish drummer (Sabaton)
Hannes Dotzler (born 1990), German cross country skier
Hannes Dreyer (born 1985), South African sprinter and Olympic competitor
Hannes Eder (born 1983), Austrian footballer
Hannes Franklin (born 1981), South African rugby player
Hannes Fuchs (born 1972), Austrian badminton player and Olympic competitor
Hannes Germann (born 1956), Swiss politician
Hannes Hólmsteinn Gissurarson (born 1953), Icelandic political science professor and commentator
Hannes Grossmann (born 8 1982), German drummer (Obscura)
Hannes Hafstein (1861–1922), Icelandic poet and politician, former Prime Minister of Iceland
Hannes Halldórsson (born 1984), Icelandic footballer
Hannes Heer (born 1941), German historian
Hannes Hegen (born 1925), German illustrator and caricaturist
Hannes Holm (born 1962), Swedish director and screenwriter
Hannes Hopley (born 1981), South African discus thrower and Olympic competitor
Hannes Hyvönen (born 1975), Finnish ice hockey player
Hannes Ignatius (1871–1941), Finnish soldier
Hannes Irmer (born 1988), German footballer
Hannes Jaenicke (born 1960), German film and television actor
Hannes Stefánsson (born 1972), Icelandic chess Grandmaster
Hannes Kaasik (born 1978), Estonian football referee
Hannes Kaljujärv (born 1957), Estonian actor
Hannes Keller (born 1934), Swiss physicist, mathematician, deep diving pioneer, and entrepreneur
Hannes Kolehmainen (1889–1966), Finnish Finnish long-distance runner and Olympic medalist
Hannes Koivunen (1911–1990), Finnish boxer and Olympic competitor
Hannes Lembacher (born 1954), Austrian fencer and Olympic competitor
Hannes Lindemann (born 1922), German doctor, navigator and sailor
Hannes Linßen (born 1949), German football player and manager
Hannes Lintl (1924–2003), Austrian architect
Hannes Löhr (born 1942), German footballer
Hannes Maasel (born 1951), Estonian politician
Hannes Manninen (born 1946), Finnish politician
Hannes Marais (born 1941), South African rugby player
Hannes Messemer (1924–1991), German film actor
Hannes Meyer (1889–1954), Swiss architect
Hannes Nikel (1931–2001), German film editor
Hannes Peckolt (born 1982), German sailor and Olympic medalist
Hannes Pétursson (born 1931), Icelandic poet and writer
Hannes Pichler, (born ????), Italian luger and Olympic competitor
Hannes Råstam (1956–2012), Swedish journalist and television presenter
Hannes Reichelt (born 1980), Austrian alpine ski racer and Olympic competitor
Hannes Reinmayr (born 1969), Austrian footballer and trainer
Hannes Rossacher (born 1952), Austrian film director and producer
Hannes Paul Schmid (born 1980), Italian alpine skier and Olympic competitor
Hannes Schneider (1890–1955), Austrian ski instructor
Hannes Sigurðsson (born 1983), Icelandic footballer
Hannes Sköld (1886–1930), Swedish socialist, anti-militarist, poet and linguist
Hannes Smárason (born 1967), Icelandic businessman
Hannes Smith (1933–2008), Namibian journalist, editor and publisher
Hannes Stiller (born 1978), Swedish footballer
Hannes Strydom (born 1965), South African rugby player
Hannes Sula (1894–1955), Finnish-Canadian revolutionary and journalist
Hannes Swoboda (born 1946), Austrian politician
Hannes Taljaard (born 1971), South African classical music composer
Hannes Trautloft (1912–1995), German World War II fighter ace
Hannes Trinkl (born 1968), Austrian alpine skier and Olympic medalist
Hannes Tretter (born 1951), Austrian lawyer and human rights expert
Hannes Torpo (1901–1980), Finnish track and field athlete and Olympic competitor
Hannes Võrno (born 1969), Estonian comedian, politician and fashion designer
Hannes Wader (born 1942), German singer-songwriter
Hannes Walter (1952–2004), Estonian war historian
Hannes Winklbauer (born 1949), Austrian footballer and coach
Hannes Zehentner (born 1965), German alpine skier and Olympic competitor

Fictional characters
 Hannes (Attack on Titan), a character in the manga series Attack on Titan